The 1984–85 NBA season was the SuperSonics' 18th season in the NBA.

It is also their first year without All-Star Gus Williams.

Draft picks

Roster

|-

Depth chart

Salaries

Regular season

Season standings

z - clinched division title
y - clinched division title
x - clinched playoff spot

Record vs. opponents

Game log

|- align="center" bgcolor="bbffbb"
|| 1 || October 26 || Utah Jazz || 94-102 || Danny Vranes (24) || King County Domed Stadium7,117 || 1–0
|- align="center" bgcolor="ffbbbb"
|| 2 || October 28  || Phoenix Suns || 102-87 || Tom Chambers (25) || King County Domed Stadium5,361 || 1–1
|- align="center" bgcolor="ffbbbb"
|| 3 || October 30 || vs Portland Trail Blazers || 115-83 || Tom Chambers (20)|| Memorial Coliseum12,666 || 1–2
|-

|- align="center" bgcolor="bbffbb"
|| 4 || November 1 || Los Angeles Lakers || 103-105 || Tom Chambers (20) || King County Domed Stadium7,070 || 2–2
|- align="center" bgcolor="ffbbbb"
|| 5 || November 2 || vs Utah Jazz || 107-101 || Tom Chambers (29) || Salt Palace3,955 || 2–3
|- align="center" bgcolor="ffbbbb"
|| 6 || November 6 || vs San Antonio Spurs || 99-91 || Tom Chambers (26) || HemisFair Arena8,085 || 2–4
|- align="center" bgcolor="ffbbbb"
|| 7 || November 8 || vs Houston Rockets || 99-89 || Tom Chambers (19) || The Summit15,202 || 2–5
|- align="center" bgcolor="ffbbbb"
|| 8 || November 10 || vs Dallas Mavericks || 106-102 || Jack Sikma (23) || Reunion Arena17,007 || 2–6
|- align="center" bgcolor="bbffbb"
|| 9 || November 13 || Golden State Warriors || 102-109 || Tom Chambers (26) || King County Domed Stadium5,105 || 3–6
|- align="center" bgcolor="bbffbb"
|| 10 || November 16 || Portland Trail Blazers || 89-91 || Tom Chambers (24) || King County Domed Stadium10,904 || 4–6
|- align="center" bgcolor="ffbbbb"
|| 11 || November 18 || New Jersey Nets || 102-97 || Al Wood (25) || King County Domed Stadium5,473 || 4–7
|- align="center" bgcolor="ffbbbb"
|| 12 || November 20 || Denver Nuggets || 124-114 || Tom Chambers (21) || King County Domed Stadium5,388 || 4–8
|- align="center" bgcolor="ffbbbb"
|| 13 || November 23 || Chicago Bulls || 113-94 || Al Wood (21) || King County Domed Stadium12,283 || 4–9
|- align="center" bgcolor="bbffbb"
|| 14 || November 25 || vs Los Angeles Lakers || 94-105 || Ricky Sobers (23) || The Forum12,270 || 5–9
|- align="center" bgcolor="bbffbb"
|| 15 || November 27 || Kansas City Kings || 96-104 || Jack Sikma (24) || King County Domed Stadium5,160 || 6–9
|- align="center" bgcolor="ffbbbb"
|| 16 || November 28 || vs Los Angeles Clippers || 106-90 || Jack Sikma (29) || Los Angeles Memorial Sports Arena6,261 || 6–10
|- align="center" bgcolor="ffbbbb"
|| 17 || November 30 || vs Dallas Mavericks || 108-98 || Tom Chambers (31) || Reunion Arena16,275 || 6–11

|- align="center" bgcolor="bbffbb"
|| 18 || December 1 || vs Houston Rockets || 86-94 || Jack Sikma (28) || The Summit12,734 || 7–11
|- align="center" bgcolor="bbffbb"
|| 19 || December 3 || Phoenix Suns || 96-108 || Jack Sikma (29) || King County Domed Stadium5,401 || 8–11
|- align="center" bgcolor="bbffbb"
|| 20 || December 6 || vs Utah Jazz || 99-106 || Jack SikmaTom Chambers(26)|| Salt Palace9,696 || 9–11
|- align="center" bgcolor="ffbbbb"
|| 21 || December 7 || San Antonio Spurs || 117-114 || Tom Chambers (27) || King County Domed Stadium5,950 || 9–12
|- align="center" bgcolor="bbffbb"
|| 22 || December 9 || Houston Rockets || 90-96 || Tom Chambers (31) || King County Domed Stadium10,865 || 10–12
|- align="center" bgcolor="bbffbb"
|| 23 || December 13 || Los Angeles Lakers || 122-124 (OT) || Tom Chambers (34) || King County Domed Stadium8,491 || 11–12
|- align="center" bgcolor="ffbbbb"
|| 24 || December 15 || vs Kansas City Kings || 110-105 || Gerald Henderson (18) || Kemper Arena5,732 || 11–13
|- align="center" bgcolor="bbffbb"
|| 25 || December 16 || vs Denver Nuggets || 101-112 || Tom Chambers (27) || McNichols Sports Arena6,108 || 12–13
|- align="center" bgcolor="bbffbb"
|| 26 || December 18 || Portland Trail Blazers || 99-109 || Jack Sikma (27) || King County Domed Stadium7,091 || 13–13
|- align="center" bgcolor="ffbbbb"
|| 27 || December 19 || vs Los Angeles Clippers || 91-86 || Al Wood (23) || Los Angeles Memorial Sports Arena10,542 || 13–14
|- align="center" bgcolor="ffbbbb"
|| 28 || December 21 || vs Golden State Warriors || 94-91 || Tom Chambers (26) || Oakland-Alameda County Coliseum Arena4,390 || 13–15
|- align="center" bgcolor="bbffbb"
|| 29 || December 23 || Los Angeles Clippers || 97-107 || Tom Chambers (31) || King County Domed Stadium8,014 || 14–15
|- align="center" bgcolor="ffbbbb"
|| 30 || December 26 || vs Los Angeles Lakers || 101-97 || Al Wood (23) || The Forum15,582 || 14–16
|- align="center" bgcolor="ffbbbb"
|| 31 || December 27 || Golden State Warriors || 101-98 || Jack Sikma (26) || King County Domed Stadium8,440 || 14–17
|- align="center" bgcolor="ffbbbb"
|| 32 || December 29 || Denver Nuggets || 115-108 || Tom Chambers (34) || King County Domed Stadium8,003 || 14–18

|- align="center" bgcolor="ffbbbb"
|| 33 || January 2 || Philadelphia 76ers || 118-109 || Tom Chambers (26) || King County Domed Stadium10,362 || 14–19
|- align="center" bgcolor="ffbbbb"
|| 34 || January 3 || vs Portland Trail Blazers || 123-89 || Tim McCormick (20) || Memorial Coliseum12,666 || 14–20
|- align="center" bgcolor="bbffbb"
|| 35 || January 5 || Indiana Pacers || 97-104 || Tom Chambers (26) || King County Domed Stadium6,242 || 15–20
|- align="center" bgcolor="ffbbbb"
|| 36 || January 7 || Dallas Mavericks || 102-84 || Tom Chambers (24) || King County Domed Stadium6,054 || 15–21
|- align="center" bgcolor="ffbbbb"
|| 37 || January 9 || vs Phoenix Suns || 94-88 || Jack Sikma (14) || Arizona Veterans Memorial Coliseum10,746 || 15–22
|- align="center" bgcolor="bbffbb"
|| 38 || January 10 || vs Golden State Warriors || 86-89 || Jack Sikma (25) || Oakland-Alameda County Coliseum Arena4,778 || 16–22
|- align="center" bgcolor="bbffbb"
|| 39 || January 13 || Kansas City Kings || 114-119 || Gerald Henderson (31) || King County Domed Stadium7,814 || 17–22
|- align="center" bgcolor="bbffbb"
|| 40 || January 15 || Los Angeles Clippers || 83-101 || Tom Chambers (24) || King County Domed Stadium5,612 || 18–22
|- align="center" bgcolor="ffbbbb"
|| 41 || January 18 || vs Atlanta Hawks || 104-90 || Jack Sikma (16) || Omni Coliseum6,749 || 18–23
|- align="center" bgcolor="bbffbb"
|| 42 || January 19 || vs Cleveland Cavaliers || 105-106 || Jack Sikma (31) || Coliseum at Richfield5,987 || 19–23
|- align="center" bgcolor="ffbbbb"
|| 43 || January 22 || vs New York Knicks || 92-90 || Tom Chambers (28) || Madison Square Garden (IV)7,850 || 19–24
|- align="center" bgcolor="bbffbb"
|| 44 || January 23 || vs Boston Celtics || 97-107 || Jack Sikma (34) || Boston Garden14,890 || 20–24
|- align="center" bgcolor="ffbbbb"
|| 45 || January 25 || vs Chicago Bulls || 93-76 || Jack Sikma (16) || Chicago Stadium17,032 || 20–25
|- align="center" bgcolor="ffbbbb"
|| 46 || January 26 || vs Detroit Pistons || 132-113 || Gerald Henderson (25) || Pontiac Silverdome22,411 || 20–26
|- align="center" bgcolor="bbffbb"
|| 47 || January 31 || San Antonio Spurs || 94-96 || Jack Sikma (24) || King County Domed Stadium5,826 || 21–26

|- align="center" bgcolor="ffbbbb"
|| 48 || February 1 || Milwaukee Bucks || 109-91 || Tom Chambers (22) || King County Domed Stadium7,830 || 21–27
|- align="center" bgcolor="ffbbbb"
|| 49 || February 3 || vs Phoenix Suns || 120-109 || Jack Sikma (30) || Arizona Veterans Memorial Coliseum12,019 || 21–28
|- align="center" bgcolor="ffbbbb"
|| 50 || February 5 || New York Knicks || 110-108 || Jack Sikma (30) || King County Domed Stadium6,538 || 21–29
|- align="center" bgcolor="ffbbbb"
|| 51 || February 6 || vs Denver Nuggets || 120-101 || Tom Chambers (22) || McNichols Sports Arena8,256 || 21–30
|- align="center" bgcolor="bbffbb"
|| 52 || February 12 || Washington Bullets || 94-109 || Tom Chambers (34) || King County Domed Stadium12,203 || 22–30
|- align="center" bgcolor="ffbbbb"
|| 53 || February 14 || Boston Celtics || 110-94 || Jack Sikma (24) || King County Domed Stadium13,509 || 22–31
|- align="center" bgcolor="ffbbbb"
|| 54 || February 16 || Kansas City Kings || 111-106 || Al Wood (25) || King County Domed Stadium6,685 || 22–32
|- align="center" bgcolor="bbffbb"
|| 55 || February 20 || vs Los Angeles Clippers || 105-118 || Tim McCormick (27) || Los Angeles Memorial Sports Arena8,447 || 23–32
|- align="center" bgcolor="bbffbb"
|| 56 || February 22 || Denver Nuggets || 123-133 || Tom Chambers (29) || King County Domed Stadium8,102 || 24–32
|- align="center" bgcolor="bbffbb"
|| 57 || February 24 || Los Angeles Clippers || 102-108 || Gerald HendersonAl Wood(18) || King County Domed Stadium7,474 || 25–32
|- align="center" bgcolor="ffbbbb"
|| 58 || February 26 || vs Golden State Warriors || 128-119 || Al Wood (26) || Oakland-Alameda County Coliseum Arena5,104 || 25–33
|- align="center" bgcolor="ffbbbb"
|| 59 || February 28 || Cleveland Cavaliers || 120-95 || Tom ChambersAl Wood(15) || King County Domed Stadium5,016 || 25–34

|- align="center" bgcolor="bbffbb"
|| 60 || March 2 || vs Indiana Pacers || 92-106 || Tom Chambers (27) || Market Square Arena8,004 || 26–34
|- align="center" bgcolor="ffbbbb"
|| 61 || March 5 || vs Milwaukee Bucks || 102-87 || Ricky Sobers (16) || MECCA Arena10,897 || 26–35
|- align="center" bgcolor="ffbbbb"
|| 62 || March 6 || vs New Jersey Nets || 129-108 || Tim McCormick (27) || Brendan Byrne Arena9,840 || 26–36
|- align="center" bgcolor="ffbbbb"
|| 63 || March 8 || vs Philadelphia 76ers || 128-114 || Ricky Sobers (26) || The Spectrum15,071 || 26–37
|- align="center" bgcolor="bbffbb"
|| 64 || March 9 || vs Washington Bullets || 92-93 || Tom Chambers (29) || Capital Centre8,967 || 27–37
|- align="center" bgcolor="ffbbbb"
|| 65 || March 11 || vs Dallas Mavericks || 103-100 || Tom Chambers (26) || Reunion Arena16,794 || 27–38
|- align="center" bgcolor="ffbbbb"
|| 66 || March 14 || San Antonio Spurs || 100-93 || Al WoodTom Chambers(19) || King County Domed Stadium5,580 || 27–39
|- align="center" bgcolor="bbffbb"
|| 67 || March 16 || Atlanta Hawks || 99-108 || Jack Sikma (24) || King County Domed Stadium6,341 || 28–39
|- align="center" bgcolor="bbffbb"
|| 68 || March 17 || Detroit Pistons || 98-106 || Tom Chambers (21) || King County Domed Stadium5,840 || 29–39
|- align="center" bgcolor="bbffbb"
|| 69 || March 20 || Golden State Warriors || 109-123 || Tim McCormick (24) || King County Domed Stadium5,641 || 30–39
|- align="center" bgcolor="ffbbbb"
|| 70 || March 22|| Utah Jazz || 110-85 || Frank Brickowski (21) || King County Domed Stadium6,337 || 30–40 
|- align="center" bgcolor="ffbbbb"
|| 71 || March 24 || vs San Antonio Spurs || 104-99 || Tim McCormick (29) || HemisFair Arena7,300 || 30–41
|- align="center" bgcolor="ffbbbb"
|| 72 || March 25 || vs Kansas City Kings || 121-106 || Tom Chambers (24) || Kemper Arena3,787 || 30–42
|- align="center" bgcolor="ffbbbb"
|| 73 || March 27 || Los Angeles Lakers || 122-97 || Tom Chambers (34) || King County Domed Stadium10,542 || 30–43
|- align="center" bgcolor="ffbbbb"
|| 74 || March 29 || Portland Trail Blazers || 125-99 || Tom Chambers (16) || King County Domed Stadium11,088 || 30–44

|- align="center" bgcolor="ffbbbb"
|| 75 || April 1 || Houston Rockets || 127-116 || Tom Chambers (26) || King County Domed Stadium6,648 || 30–45
|- align="center" bgcolor="ffbbbb"
|| 76 || April 2 || vs Phoenix Suns || 119-109 || Jon Sundvold (24) || Arizona Veterans Memorial Coliseum9,742 || 30–46
|- align="center" bgcolor="bbffbb"
|| 77 || April 4 || vs Utah Jazz || 118-119 || Tom Chambers (34) || Salt Palace9,250 || 31–46
|- align="center" bgcolor="ffbbbb"
|| 78 || April 5 || vs Portland Trail Blazers || 145-120 || Tom Chambers (22) || Memorial Coliseum12,666 || 31–47
|- align="center" bgcolor="ffbbbb"
|| 79 || April 7 || Phoenix Suns || 125-110 || Tom Chambers (38) || King County Domed Stadium5,672 || 31–48
|- align="center" bgcolor="ffbbbb"
|| 80 || April 11 || Dallas Mavericks || 124-80 || Al Wood (22) || King County Domed Stadium4,272 || 31–49
|- align="center" bgcolor="ffbbbb"
|| 81 || April 12 || vs Los Angeles Lakers || 145-131 || Al Wood (35) || The Forum15,434 || 31–50
|- align="center" bgcolor="ffbbbb"
|| 82 || April 14 || vs Houston Rockets || 121-98 || Tom Chambers (27) || The Summit10,118 || 31–51

 Green background indicates win.
 Red background indicates loss.

Player stats
Note: GP= Games played; FG= Field Goals; FT= Free Throws; FTA = Free Throws Attempted; AST = Assists; PTS = Points

Awards and records
1985 NBA All-Star Game selections (game played on February 10, 1985)
 Jack Sikma

Non All-Star Awards and records
 Danny Vranes, All-Defensive 2nd Team
 Jack Sikma, December 2 Player of The Month

Transactions

References

See also
 1984-85 NBA season

Seattle SuperSonics seasons
S